Mehran Noorafkan (born November 17, 1986) is an Iranian footballer who plays for Bargh Shiraz F.C. in the IPL.

Club career
Noorafkan has played with Bargh Shiraz since 2010.

Assists

References

1986 births
Living people
Esteghlal F.C. players
Iranian footballers
Association football defenders
People from Shiraz
Sportspeople from Fars province